Griff is a hamlet in the Nuneaton and Bedworth district of Warwickshire, England. The hamlet is on the A444 road between the towns of Nuneaton and Bedworth.

Formerly a coal mining area there is evidence that coal was obtained from Griff from as early as the twelfth century. Griff Quarry produces  of aggregate annually.

Mary Ann Evans (George Eliot) was brought up at Griff House, now a hotel. Griff is likely represented in Eliot's novel Middlemarch as "Frick", which is described as "[Mr Solomon's] side of Lowick was the most remote from the village, and the houses of the labouring people were either lone cottages or were collected in a hamlet called Frick, where a water-mill and some stone-pits made a little centre of slow, heavy-shouldered industry."

Now it’s mostly just the A444, grasslands and Coventry Road which leads into Bedworth.

References

External links

Villages in Warwickshire